Mary Mushinsky (born October 7, 1951) is an American politician who has served in the Connecticut House of Representatives from the 85th district since 1981.

In 1992, she was awarded the Sierra Club Distinguished Service Award, which honors persons in public service for strong and consistent commitment to conservation. Mushinsky was a member of the Environment Committee and in 1990, as chair of that committee, Mushinsky introduced a bill that is believed to be the first bill passed in the United States to use the term climate change. During the 2021-2022 session, she is serving as a deputy speaker of the Connecticut House of Representatives.

References

1951 births
Living people
Democratic Party members of the Connecticut House of Representatives
21st-century American politicians
20th-century American politicians
21st-century American women politicians
Politicians from New Haven, Connecticut
Women in Connecticut politics
20th-century American women politicians